The People's Choice was an American funk band formed in 1971 in Philadelphia by Frank Brunson and David Thompson. While they had several vocalists, their biggest hits were instrumentals.

Career
Their debut single, "I Likes To Do It" on Phil-L.A. of Soul Records, got to #9 on the U.S. Billboard R&B chart and #38 on the Billboard Hot 100. A short time later Kenny Gamble and Leon Huff saw People's Choice in concert, and told Brunson that they wished the group had recorded "I Likes To Do It" for Philadelphia International Records. Gamble & Huff signed the group up in 1974, and it was with them that they had another hit single with "Do It Any Way You Wanna." It sold over one million copies in three months, and was awarded a gold disc by the R.I.A.A. in November 1975. This song was used in Fred Williamson's 1976 film Death Journey.

Brunson died on November 24, 2007 after a long illness.

Former members
Frank Brunson - keyboards, vocals (died on November 24, 2007, at age 78).
David Thomson - drums
Guy Fiske - guitar
Roger Andrews - bass 
Marc Reed - vocals 
Clifton Gamble - piano, synthesizer
Johnnie Hightower - guitar 
Bill Rodgers - piano, synthesizer
Darnell Jordan - guitar 
Stanley Thomas - bass, vocals
Valerie Brown - vocals

Discography

Studio albums
{| class="wikitable" style="text-align:center;"
|-
! rowspan="2"| Year
! rowspan="2"| Title
! colspan="3"| Peak chart positions
! rowspan="2"| Record label
|- style="font-size:smaller;"
! width="35"| US
! width="35"| USR&B
! width="35"| SWE
|-
| rowspan="1"| 1975
| align="left"| Boogie Down U.S.A.
| 56
| 7
| 45
| rowspan="2"| TSOP
|-
| rowspan="1"| 1976
| align="left"| We Got the Rhythm
| 174
| 38
| —
|-
| rowspan="1"| 1978
| align="left"| Turn Me Loose
| —
| —
| —
| rowspan="1"| Philadelphia International
|-
| rowspan="1"| 1980
| align="left"| People's Choice
| —
| —
| —
| rowspan="1"| Casablanca
|-
| rowspan="1"| 1982
| align="left"| Still in Love with You
| —
| —
| — 
| rowspan="1"| TPC
|-
| rowspan="1"| 1984
| align="left"| Strikin'''
| —
| —
| —
| rowspan="1"| Mercury
|-
| colspan="15" style="font-size:90%" | "—" denotes a recording that did not chart or was not released in that territory.
|}

Compilation albumsGolden Classics (1996, Collectables)I Likes to Do It (2000, Jamie)Any Way You Wanna - The People's Choice Anthology 1971-1981'' (2017, BBR)

Singles

References

External links
 
 
 soulfulkindamusic.net - Frankie Brunson / The Fashions
 Frankie Brunson Biography

Musical groups from Philadelphia
American disco groups
Musical groups established in 1971
Philadelphia International Records artists